Pentila occidentalium, the unmarked red pentila, is a butterfly in the family Lycaenidae. It is found in Nigeria, Cameroon, Equatorial Guinea and Gabon.

Subspecies
Pentila occidentalium occidentalium (southern Nigeria, Cameroon)
Pentila occidentalium gabunica Stempffer & Bennett, 1961 (Equatorial Guinea, Gabon)

References

Butterflies described in 1899
Poritiinae
Butterflies of Africa
Taxa named by Per Olof Christopher Aurivillius